The Secretariat of Culture, formerly known as the National Council for Culture and Arts ( or CONACULTA), is a Mexican government agency in charge of the nation's museums and monuments, promoting and protecting the arts (visual, plastic, theatrical, musical, dance, architectural, literary, televisual and cinematographic), and managing the national archives.

It was created in 1988 and was a decentralized body of the Secretariat of Public Education. On December 18, 2015, CONACULTA was elevated to a secretariat following the passage of a law originally promoted three months earlier by President Enrique Peña Nieto.

Diplomat, historian and lawyer Rafael Tovar y de Teresa was the first culture secretary; in office for one year since CONACULTA was elevated to a Cabinet-level position in December 2015 until 10 December 2016, when Tovar y de Teresa died in Mexico city at the age of 62.

Subsidiaries

Subsidiaries of the Secretariat of Culture include the Biblioteca Vasconcelos, the National Fund for Culture and the Arts (FONCA), the Instituto Mexicano de Cinematografía, the Instituto Nacional de Antropología e Historia and Instituto Nacional de Bellas Artes y Literatura.

Broadcasting
Upon its creation, the Secretariat of Culture took control of CONACULTA's television station Canal 22, seen on air in Mexico City and relayed by 25 SPR transmitters, as well as Radio Educación, which had previously been part of the SEP. Both stations transmit cultural and educational content.

References

External links
 Secretaría de Cultura (official website)—

Executive branch of the government of Mexico
Culture ministers
Arts in Mexico
Mexican culture
2015 establishments in Mexico
Government agencies established in 2015
Arts organizations established in 2015